Babesiosoma is a genus of parasitic alveolates in the phylum Apicomplexia.

They have two hosts in their life cycle: the vertebrate hosts are fish and the invertebrate vectors are leeches.

This genus has been poorly studied and little is known about it.

History

The genus was created in 1956 by Jakowski and Nigrelli.

Seven species have been recognised in this genus.

Meronts: These develop in erythrocytes and divide to produce four small merozoites, characteristically in a cruciform or rosette arrangement.

Gametocytes: These are larger and more elongated than the meronts and are generally club-shaped.

References

Apicomplexa genera
Conoidasida